Zdenka Prusnik-Cerar (7 September 1941 – 28 August 2013) was a Yugoslavian gymnast who competed at the 1962 World Artistic Gymnastics Championships.  She had a very prominent political career, being appointed, in 1999, the General State Prosecutor in the National Assembly of Slovenia and, later in 2005, the Minister of Justice of Slovenia.  She was the wife of European, World, and Olympic individual champion gymnast Miroslav Cerar and the mother of Miro Cerar, Prime Minister of Slovenia from 2014–2018.

References

1941 births
2013 deaths
Sportspeople from Ljubljana
Yugoslav female artistic gymnasts